Randy Smith (born June 15, 1963) is an American professional baseball executive. He has served as general manager of Major League Baseball's San Diego Padres (1993–95) and Detroit Tigers (1996–2002), and as assistant general manager for the Colorado Rockies (1991–93).

Biography
Smith is the son of baseball executive Tal Smith. Smith became the GM of the Padres midseason in 1993 at age 29. At the time, he was the youngest general manager in baseball history. In his time as Padres GM, he acquired future MVP Ken Caminiti and eventual all-stars Trevor Hoffman, Andy Ashby, Steve Finley and Brad Ausmus. In a highly criticized trade at the time, Smith traded star Gary Sheffield to the Florida Marlins for rookie Trevor Hoffman. Although Hoffman went on to set the Major League record for saves with the Padres, earn induction into the baseball Hall of Fame and have his number retired in San Diego; Sheffield was twice as productive as Hoffman after the trade, according to wins above replacement, generating 53.1 WAR compared to only 27.2 for Hoffman.

Smith spent six years as the vice president of baseball operations and general manager for Detroit Tigers, in which the team received Organization of the Year Honors from Baseball America and Howe Sports Data in 1997. He was also named Baseball America'''s American League Executive of the Year in 1997. Smith inherited a Tigers roster that was in flux with the retirements of former all-stars Alan Trammell and Lou Whitaker, as well as longtime manager Sparky Anderson. In an effort to obtain young and inexpensive talent, Smith traded away highly paid all-stars Travis Fryman and Cecil Fielder. Smith was known for several trades involving the Tigers and his former team, the San Diego Padres, and for several trades with the Houston Astros, where his father Tal Smith was president of baseball operations. Catcher Brad Ausmus was involved in five trades by Smith, being acquired three times and twice being traded away.

Under Smith, the Tigers acquired a host of young players that were listed as "Top 100 Prospects" by Baseball America'', including former top-10 prospects Brian Hunter, Andújar Cedeño, and Matt Drews. Despite the collection of younger talent, the Tigers failed to achieve a winning record in any of Smith's seven seasons with the club. The pitching, attendance, and payroll ranked near the bottom of the American League until the team moved to Comerica Park in 2000.

Following a 0–6 start to the 2002 season, Smith was fired along with manager Phil Garner. He then returned to the San Diego Padres in 2003 as director of professional and international scouting. In 2010, Smith was named the Padres' Director of Player Development. Over the next few years, the Padres had one of the top farm systems in baseball, being ranked #1 by ESPN in 2012.

In 2016, the Hokkaido Nippon-Ham Fighters of Nippon Professional Baseball hired Smith as a senior advisor to their general manager.

References

1963 births
Living people
Detroit Tigers executives
Hokkaido Nippon-Ham Fighters
Major League Baseball executives
Major League Baseball general managers
San Diego Padres executives
San Diego Padres scouts
Sportspeople from Houston
Texas Rangers scouts